The 2009 Xinjiang earthquake occurred in the Xinjiang of the People's Republic of China.  It occurred at 9:47 a.m in Qapqal on January 25, 2009.

Location
The epicenter was at 43.3 degrees north latitude and 80.9 degrees east longitude at a depth of  according to the China Earthquake Administration. The quake occurred  from the regional capital Ürümqi.

Damage
It has affected more than 4,500 people and caused house collapses and other damage. In total, 4,549 people in the Xibe Autonomous County of Qapqal and Zhaosu County were affected. They have been relocated to schools, government buildings and tents, said a regional civil affairs department official. No casualties have been reported so far.

A total of 198 houses collapsed and 2,928 were damaged. The direct economic loss was estimated at 21 million yuan ($US 3.1 million).

See also
List of earthquakes in 2009
List of earthquakes in China

References

External links

2009 Xinjiang
Xinjiang earthquake
Xinjiang earthquake